Beygulovo (Beyğol) is a rural locality (a selo) in Shemyaksky Selsoviet, Ufimsky District, Bashkortostan, Russia. The population was 172 as of 2010. There is 1 street.

Geography 
Beygulovo is located 48 km west of Ufa (the district's administrative centre) by road. Oktyabrsky is the nearest rural locality.

References 

Rural localities in Ufimsky District